Hole pincer (also holing pincer) can refer to:

Hole punch
Leather punch